The Alamblak languages are a small family of two closely related languages, 
Kaningra and Alamblak. 

They are generally classified among the Sepik Hill languages of the Sepik family of northern Papua New Guinea.

References

Bibliography
 

 
Sepik Hill languages